The Śiva·sūtras, technically akṣara·samāmnāya, variously called ,  pratyāhāra·sūtrāṇi, varṇa·samāmnāya, etc., refer to a set of fourteen aphorisms devised as an arrangement of the sounds of Sanskrit for the purposes of grammatical exposition as carried out by the grammarian Pāṇini in the Aṣṭādhyāyī.

Pāṇini himself uses the term akṣara·samāmnāya whereas the colloquial term "Shiva sutra" is a later development, as per claims by Nandikeśvara in his Kāśikā, that the god Śiva sounded his drum fourteen times to reveal these sounds to Pāṇini. They were either composed by Pāṇini to accompany his  or predate him.

Text and notation

 a i u Ṇ
 ṛ ḷ K 
 e o Ṅ
 ai au C
 ha ya va ra Ṭ
 la Ṇ
 ña ma ṅa ṇa na M
 jha bha Ñ
 gha ḍha dha Ṣ
 ja ba ga ḍa da Ś
 kha pha cha ṭha tha ca ṭa ta V
 ka pa Y
 śa ṣa sa R
 ha L

Each verse consists of a group of basic Sanskrit phonemes (i.e. open syllables consisting either of initial vowels or consonants followed by the basic vowel "a") followed by a single 'dummy letter', or anubandha, conventionally rendered in upper case and named '' by Pāṇini.

Scheme

Pratyāhāras are thus single syllables, but they can be declined (see Aṣṭādhyāyī 6.1.77 below). Hence the pratyāhāra aL refers to all phonemes (because it consists of the first phoneme of the first verse (a) and the last anubandha of the last verse (L)); aC refers to vowels (i.e., all of the phonemes before the anubandha C: i.e. a i u ṛ ḷ e o ai au); haL to consonants, and so on.

Issues

Note that some pratyāhāras are ambiguous. The anubandha Ṇ occurs twice in the list, which means that you can assign two different meanings to pratyāhāra aṆ (including or excluding ṛ, etc.); in fact, both of these meanings are used in the Aṣṭādhyāyī. On the other hand, the pratyāhāra haL is always used in the meaning "all consonants"—Pāṇini never uses pratyāhāras to refer to sets consisting of a single phoneme.

Combinations
From these 14 verses, a total of 280 pratyāhāras can be formed: 14*3 + 13*2 + 12*2 + 11*2 + 10*4 + 9*1 + 8*5 + 7*2 + 6*3 + 5*5 + 4*8 + 3*2 + 2*3 +1*1, minus 14 (as Pāṇini does not use single element pratyāhāras) minus 11 (as there are 11 duplicate sets due to h appearing twice); the second multiplier in each term represents the number of phonemes in each. But Pāṇini uses only 41 (with a 42nd introduced by later grammarians, raṆ=r l) pratyāhāras in the Aṣṭādhyāyī.

Arrangement
The Akṣarasamāmnāya puts phonemes with a similar manner of articulation together (so sibilants in 13 śa ṣa sa R, nasals in 7 ñ m ṅ ṇ n M).  Economy  is a major principle of their organization, and it is debated whether Pāṇini deliberately encoded phonological patterns in them (as they were treated in traditional phonetic texts called Prātiśakyas) or simply grouped together phonemes which he needed to refer to in the Aṣṭādhyāyī and which only secondarily reflect phonological patterns.  Pāṇini does not use the Akṣarasamāmnāya to refer to homorganic stops, but rather the anubandha U: to refer to the palatals c ch j jh he uses cU.

Example

As an example, consider Aṣṭādhyāyī 6.1.77: :

 iK means i u ṛ ḷ, 
 iKaḥ is iK in the genitive case, so it means ' in place of i u ṛ ḷ; 
 yaṆ means the semivowels y v r l and is in the nominative, so iKaḥ yaṆ means: y v r l replace i u ṛ ḷ.
 aC means all vowels, as noted above
 aCi is in the locative case, so it means before any vowel.

Hence this rule replaces a vowel with its corresponding semivowel when followed by any vowel, and that is why  together with  makes . To apply this rule correctly we must be aware of some of the other rules of the grammar, such as:
1.1.49  which says that the genitive case in a sutra signifies "in the place of" 
1.1.50  which says that in a substitution, the element in the substitute series that most closely resembles the letter to be substituted should be used (e.g. y for i, r for ṛ etc.)
1.1.71   which says that a sequence with an element at the beginning (e.g. i) and an IT letter (e.g. K) at the end stands for the intervening letters (i.e. i u ṛ ḷ, because the Akṣarasamāmnāya sutras read ).

Also, rules can be debarred by other rules:

 6.1.101   teaches that vowels (from the aK pratyāhāra) of the same quality come together to make a long vowel, so for instance  and  make , not . This  rule takes precedence over the general  rule mentioned above, because this rule is more specific.

Pratyāhāras

Despite the possible combinations seen above, here are the 41 pratyāhāras in actual use by Pāṇini:

 aL ⇒ all sounds 
 ac ⇒ vowels 
 haL ⇒ consonants

Vowel groups
 1aK ⇒ a i u ṛ ḷ  
 aṆ ⇒ a i u
 iC ⇒ i u ṛ ḷ e o ai au 
 iK ⇒ i u ṛ ḷ
 uK ⇒ u ṛ ḷ
 eC ⇒ e o ai au 
 eṆ ⇒ e o
 aiC ⇒ ai au

Vowel and consonant groups

 aŚ ⇒ vowels and voiced consonants
 aM ⇒ vowels, h, semivowels, and nasal stops
 aṆ ⇒ vowels, h, and semivowels
 aṬ ⇒ vowels, h, and semivowels other than l
 iṆ ⇒ vowels other than a; h and semivowels

Consonant group

 haŚ ⇒ voiced consonants 
 yaR ⇒ semivowels, stops, and voiceless spirants
 yaY ⇒ semivowels and stops
 yaÑ ⇒ semivowels, nasal stops, jh bh
 yaM ⇒ semivowels and nasal stops
 yaṆ ⇒ semivowels 
 vaL ⇒ consonants other than y
 vaŚ ⇒ voiced consonants other than y
 raL ⇒ consonants other than y and v
 ñam ⇒ nasal stops
 maY ⇒ stops other than ñ
 ṅaM ⇒ ṅ ṇ n
 jhaL ⇒ consonants other than nasal stops and semivowels
 jhaR ⇒ nonnasal stops, voiceless aspirants
 jhaY ⇒ nonnasal stops
 jhaŚ ⇒ voiced nonnasal stops
 jhaṢ ⇒ voiced aspirated stops
 bhaṢ ⇒ voiced aspirated stops other than jh
 jaŚ ⇒ voiced unaspirated nonnasal stops
 baŚ ⇒ voiced unaspirated nonnasal stops other than j
 khaR ⇒ voiceless stops, voiceless aspirants
 khaY ⇒ voiceless stops
 chaV ⇒ ch ṭh th c ṭ t
 cay ⇒ voiceless unaspirated stops
 caR ⇒ voiceless unaspirated stops, voiceless spirants
 śaL ⇒ spirants
 śaR ⇒ voiceless spirants

See also
Generative grammar
Aṣṭādhyāyī
Pāṇini
Sanskrit grammar

Organization of sounds in other languages
Alphabet song
Iroha, a Japanese pangram
Thousand Character Classic, a Chinese mnemonic traditionally popular in Korea

Notes

Glossary

References

Bibliography

 (Books I to VIII reflecting the original)

External links
 Paper by Paul Kiparsky on 'Economy and the Construction of the Śiva sūtras'
 Paper by Andras Kornai relating the Śiva sūtras to contemporary Feature Geometry.
 Paper by Wiebke Petersen  on 'A Mathematical Analysis of Pāṇini’s  Śiva sūtras.'
 Paper by Madhav Deshpande on 'Who Inspired Pāṇini? Reconstructing the Hindu and Buddhist Counter-Claims.'

Vyakarana
Collation
Shaiva texts
Sanskrit texts
Hindu texts